Sorkh Zu (also Romanized as Sorkh Zū, Sorkh Zow, and Sorkhzū; also known as Sorkheh Zū, Sorkhen Zū, and Surkhzao) is a village in Takmaran Rural District, Sarhad District, Shirvan County, North Khorasan Province, Iran. At the 2006 census, its population was 314, in 78 families.

References 

Populated places in Shirvan County